PowerMILL is a 3D CAM solution that runs on Microsoft Windows for the programming of tool paths for 2 to 5 axis CNC (Computer Numerical Control) Milling machines developed by Autodesk Inc. The software is used in a range of different engineering industries to determine optimal tool paths to reduce time and manufacturing costs as well as reduce tool loads and produce smooth surface finishes. More than 15,000 organisations use PowerMILL worldwide.

History

The code of PowerMILL originates from the software DUCT which was developed in 1973 by Donald Welbourn and Ed Lambourne along with the help of Delta Metal Group, whose funding aided the transfer of the system into industry. DUCT was initially developed with the sponsorship of Control Data in Germany in the form of access to their time-sharing computing resources. The advancement of mini computers from 1982 meant that it became economically viable to design complex 3D shapes using a computer.

From 1995 to 1998 DUCT was gradually replaced with a new range of products, which covered the full manufacturing cycle from conceptual design through to manufacture. Delcam's Power Solution range of products that built upon the functionality of the DUCT suite, incorporated the latest user interface technology and offered users many new benefits.

Release History

Ad-ons

PowerMILL Pro includes PS-Exchange a CAD data translator for all neutral import and export (IGES and VDA and STEP)

PowerMILL 3+2 Machining where a 3 axis milling program is executed with the cutting tool locked in a tilted position

PowerMILL 4&5 axis machining for 4 and 5 axis machines

PowerMILL Rotary Axis for machines using a rotary axis

PowerMILL Training Seat/IGES Viewer

PowerMILL Port Machining for the machining of tubular apertures

PowerMILL Blade, Blisk & Impeller Machining

PowerMILL Robot Interface for programming of robotic arms

See also 
Autodesk
Delcam
PowerSHAPE
PowerINSPECT

References

Computer-aided manufacturing software